Parque Naucalli is a park in Mexico City in the municipality of Naucalpan de Juárez. Planning for the park began in 1975. Reforesting the area began in 1977 and the park opened to the public in 1982.

References 

Parks in Mexico City